The lieutenant governor of Louisiana is the second highest state office in Louisiana.  The current lieutenant governor is Billy Nungesser, a Republican. The lieutenant governor is also the commissioner of the Louisiana Department of Culture, Recreation & Tourism.

Paul J. Hardy, who served from 1988 to 1992, was the first Republican to be elected to the position since the Reconstruction Era. This was largely because of the racial suppression in state politics during the first half and more of the 20th century. 

Following Reconstruction, conservative white Democrats regained control of the state political power and passed legislation that disenfranchised most African Americans, who were majority Republicans. It was not until after passage of civil rights legislation that most African Americans regained their ability to vote. But party alignments changed and since the late 20th century, most conservative whites are aligned with the Republican Party in Louisiana and most African Americans with the Democratic Party.

History
The office was established by the Louisiana Constitution of 1845. Prior to that, the successor to the governor in the event of his death or resignation was the President of the Louisiana State Senate. A number of state senate presidents succeeded governors before the 1845 Constitution was adopted, including Henry S. Thibodaux, Armand Beauvais and Jacques Dupre.

The lieutenant governor presided over the Louisiana Senate from 1845 until the adoption of the Louisiana Constitution of 1974. Today, the lieutenant governor exercises powers delegated to him or her by the governor as provided by law. She or he also becomes governor if the previous governor dies, resigns or is removed from office via impeachment & conviction. If the governor is unable to act as governor, or is out of state, the lieutenant governor assumes the governors powers and duties as acting governor. Under the constitution, the lieutenant governor no longer serves as ex officio president of the senate, but is made an ex officio member of each committee, board and commission on which the governor serves. (Louisiana Constitution Article IV, Section 6) Additionally, the lieutenant governor serves as commissioner of the Louisiana Department of Culture, Recreation & Tourism.

List of lieutenant governors

Parties

1846–1860

Civil War era

Lieutenant governors of Confederate Louisiana

Lieutenant governors of Union-held territory in Louisiana

Resumption of U.S. statehood

See also

Governor of Louisiana
President of the Louisiana State Senate

References

External links
http://senate.la.gov/Documents/Membership/Documents/SenateMembership1880ForwardRevisedMar2011.pdf

Lieutenant Governor
1846 establishments in Louisiana